Atherington may refer to:
 Atherington, Devon
 Atherington, West Sussex
 Atherington Priory, a priory in West Sussex, England